Peace, Perfect Peace is a 1918 British silent drama film directed by Arrigo Bocchi and starring Hayford Hobbs, Mary Odette and Mary Marsh Allen. The Armistice that ends the First World War allows French and British soldiers to return home.

Cast
 Hayford Hobbs as Poilu  
 Mary Odette as Marie Odette  
 Mary Marsh Allen as Mrs. Atkins  
 Charles Vane as Pensioner  
 Bert Wynne as Tommy Atkins 
 Evelyn Harding as Mother  
 Chubby Hobbs as Child

References

Bibliography
 Low, Rachael. The History of British Film, Volume III: 1914-1918. Routledge, 1997.

External links

1918 films
1918 drama films
British silent short films
British drama films
British World War I films
Films set in London
Films set in England
Films set in France
Films directed by Arrigo Bocchi
British black-and-white films
1910s English-language films
1910s British films
Silent drama films